The 65th edition of the KNVB Cup started on September 4, 1982. The two legs of the final were played on May 10 and 17, 1983: Ajax beat NEC 3–1 on both occasions and won the cup for the ninth time. From the quarter finals onwards, two-legged matches were held. If two teams drew both matches, or if they both won one, extra time was played right after the second match, no matter what the aggregate score was.

Teams
 All 18 participants of the 1982–83 Eredivisie, fifteen of which entering in the second round, the other three entering in the first round
 All 17 participants of the 1982–83 Eerste Divisie, entering in the first round
 28 teams from lower (amateur) leagues, entering in the preliminary round

Preliminary round
The matches of the preliminary round were played on September 4 and 5, 1982. Only amateur clubs participated.

First round
The matches of the first round were played on October 9 and 10, 1982. Twenty professional clubs entered the tournament here.

E Eredivisie; 1 Eerste Divisie

Second round
The matches of the second round were played on November 13 and 14, 1982. Fifteen Eredivisie clubs entered the tournament here.

E 15 Eredivisie entrants

Round of 16
The matches of the round of 16 were played on January 8 and January 9, 1983.

Quarter finals
The quarter finals were played on February 23 and March 9, 1983. Two-legged matches were played from this point on. When both teams won once, or drew twice, extra time (and if necessary a penalty shootout) was held no matter what the aggregate score was.

Semi-finals
The semi-finals were played on March 30 and April 13, 1983.

Final
The final was played on May 10 and 17, 1983.

Ajax also won the Dutch Eredivisie championship, thereby taking the double. They would participate in the European Cup, so finalists NEC could play in the Cup Winners' Cup.

See also
 Eredivisie 1982-83
 Eerste Divisie 1982-83

References

External links
 Netherlands Cup Full Results 1970–1994 by the RSSSF

1982-83
1982–83 domestic association football cups
KNVB Cup